"La Despedida" is a single by Puerto Rican reggaeton singer Daddy Yankee. It is the third official single released on August 4, 2010 from his album Daddy Yankee Mundial. The official remix of the song features American singer Tony Dize. This song resembles his other song Que Tengo Que Hacer. The music video also resembles his other song's music video Llamado De Emergencia.

Critical reception
Matthew Wilkening from AOL Radio Blog said that the song "combines an infectious mid-tempo dance beat with Latin horns and percussion, as Daddy Yankee bids farewell — but seemingly refuses to give up a lover who is moving away from him, despite his friends' best advice". It received and award for "Urban Song of the Year" at the 2012 ASCAP Awards, which are awarded annually by the American Society of Composers, Authors and Publishers in the United States.

Music video
The music video for the song was released on August 23, 2009. It was directed by George Rivera and Juan Esteban Suárez. It shows the artist's mother-in-law going to the hospital for brain cancer, and shows the artist's wife shaving her head as a sympathy gesture.

Versions
Album version
Official Remix (featuring Tony Dize)
Bachata version
Instrumental

Remixes
Edson R'S Official Club Mix
Edson R'S Official Instrumental Club Mix
J. Rhythm & Ricky Luna Club Remix

Charts and certifications

Year-end charts

Sales and certifications

References

External links

Daddy Yankee's official website

2010 songs
Spanish-language songs
Daddy Yankee songs
Songs written by Daddy Yankee
2010 singles